The Regal Theater was a night club, theater, and music venue, popular among African-Americans, located in the Bronzeville neighborhood in Chicago, Illinois. The theater was designed by Edward Eichenbaum, and opened in February 1928. It closed in 1968 and was demolished in 1973.

Part of the Balaban and Katz chain, the lavishly decorated venue, with plush carpeting and velvet drapes, featured some of the most celebrated African-American entertainers in America. 

On what for a time was known as the Chitlin' Circuit, the Regal also featured motion pictures and live stage shows. Nat "King" Cole, Cab Calloway, Louis Armstrong, Ella Fitzgerald, Sarah Vaughan, Lena Horne, Dinah Washington, Miles Davis, Sammy Davis Jr., Lionel Hampton, Dizzy Gillespie, and Duke Ellington performed frequently at the theater through the 1920s and 1940s.

Other acts to appear at the Regal over the years have included such performers as The Supremes, Wayne Cochran, The Esquires The Temptations, The Four Tops, B.B. King, Herbie Hancock, Della Reese, Stevie Wonder, Les Paul, Gladys Knight & The Pips, International Sweethearts of Rhythm, Dionne Warwick, James Brown & The Famous Flames, The Isley Brothers, John Coltrane, Dorothy Dandridge, Revella Hughes, Five Stairsteps, Peg Leg Bates, Dave Peyton and Martha and the Vandellas.

History 
The Regal was a major complex that featured films, dance, music, and comedy. The theater was a prominent entertainment venue for over four decades in Chicago, Illinois. This theater opened on February 4, 1928, located in  “Bronzeville”, at Congress Parkway and State Street. The theater was designed by Levy and Klein and was influenced by the Harlem Savoy Ballroom located in New York City. 

Owned by a white business association in Chicago, and seating about 3,000 people, the theater was one of the first entertainment complexes available for black audiences, employing black staff members (other than the musical acts). 

In its early years, the Regal  featured silent films, well known black musicians of all types of genres—mainly jazz and blue. Performers included Ray Charles, Sam Cooke, Stevie Wonder, Ella Fitzgerald, The Temptations, Miles Davis, Nat “King” Cole, Duke Ellington, Paul Robeson, the Jackson Five, and B.B. King. Typically shows consisted of an opening musical act followed by a film. The theater was situated near two popular black venues: both a nightclub (the Savoy Ballroom) and a major retailer (the South Center Department store).

The Regal was a lavishly decorated, featuring velvet seating, large pillars, and grand spaces. Costing $1.5 million (in 1928 dollars) to construct, the Regal opened new doors for African Americans in the entertainment business.

One of the house bands recruited for the Regal was Fess Williams and his Royal Flush Orchestra. They had been an opening act at the Savoy Ballroom and had begun to gain a following. Aware of their increased popularity, Balaban and Katz hired them as the Regal house band.

Often compared to the Apollo in Harlem, the Regal actually opened six years earlier, and had double the seating capacity. Both theaters were able to attract several big names but, due to its size and central location, the Regal was arguably able to book bigger acts. 

Prior to the opening of the Regal, Chicago experienced the Great Migration, which brought a large number of blacks from the south into the city looking for a new life and work. After the signing of the Emancipation Proclamation in 1863, blacks began to slowly move from their southern homes. Once blacks had the ability to move away from their slave owners and find industrial jobs, the north was able to provide this “new life” for them. Over a 20-30 year period, waves of thousands of blacks left the south and entered major cities like Chicago, New York City, Detroit, and so on.

For most of its time, the Regal thrived with business by bringing in musical talents from across the country. People had some of the best times at the theater which helped spread the word about it and bring in more business. Eventually, with developments in technology like with the radio and TV, business began to decline. With the repercussions of all these factors, the Regal began losing more and more business which eventually led to the owner having to file bankruptcy and close down the theater in 1968. The building was later demolished in 1973. The site is now occupied by the Harold Washington Cultural Center.

Notable events
In June 1962, "Little" Stevie Wonder recorded his famous live version of the number-one hit single "Fingertips" at a Motortown Revue there that included Marvin Gaye, Smokey Robinson & The Miracles, Mary Wells, and The Marvelettes. In May 1964, during a performance at the theater, Aretha Franklin was crowned, "the Queen of Soul" by music promoter Pervis Spann.

B.B. King recorded his famous live album Live at the Regal at the theater in November 1964. Gene Chandler appeared many times at the theater, and recorded a live album there in 1965 (variously titled Live at the Regal and Live On Stage In '65). From August 12–27, 1968, The Jackson 5 opened for Motown acts Gladys Knight & The Pips and Bobby Taylor & the Vancouvers.

Notes

References

Bibliography 

 Green, Adam (2007). Selling the Race: Culture, Community, and Black Chicago, 1940–1955. Chicago: University of Chicago Press. 

 Moore, D. "CineWiki - Regal Theater and African-American Exhibition in Chicago." CineWiki - Regal Theater and African-American Exhibition in Chicago, 14 Dec. 2008. Web. 23 Apr. 2013.

 "Once Majestic Regal Awaits Wrecker", Chicago Tribune, September 6, 1973.

 Ottley, Roy. "Regal Theater, Frayed but Imposing, Tailored for the Community", Chicago Tribune, February 27, 1955.

 Semmes, Clovis E. (2006). The Regal Theater and Black Culture. New York: Palgrave Macmillan. 

Jazz clubs in Chicago
Music venues in Chicago
Defunct jazz clubs in Illinois
Music venues completed in 1928
Theatres completed in 1928
1928 establishments in Illinois
Historically African-American theaters and music venues
Demolished buildings and structures in Chicago
Buildings and structures demolished in 1973